Marco Cappai (born 20 September 1973) is an Italian equestrian. He competed in the individual eventing at the 1996 Summer Olympics.

References

1973 births
Living people
Italian male equestrians
Olympic equestrians of Italy
Equestrians at the 1996 Summer Olympics
Sportspeople from Rome